The 2022 Women's Premier League Rugby season is the twelfth season of the Women's Premier League.

Season change 
This season of the WPL will commence in the spring of 2022 unlike previous seasons which were played in the fall. WPL Reps along with the Competitions/Scheduling committee agreed to move the WPL league season to spring to align better with international playing windows and also with Division 1 and 2 Championships. This was initially supposed to start in Spring 2021, but was postponed because of COVID-19.

Season Standings 
Final standings after the regular season:

Red Conference

Blue Conference

Regular season

Week 1

Week 2

Week 3

Week 4

Week 5

Week 6

Week 7

Week 8

Week 9

Week 10

Play-offs

Bowl Competition

9th Place Final

7th Place Final

5th Place Final

Cup Competition

Semi-finals

3th Place Final

Grand Final

References

External links 

 USA Rugby Women's Premier League official site

Women's Premier League
Women's Premier League